A Good Enough Day is the second album by Canadian singer-songwriter Royal Wood, released in 2007 on Dead Daisy Records.

Track listing
 "A Good Enough Day"
 "Juliet"
 "Safe Haven"
 "A Mirror Without"
 "I'm So Glad"
 "Siren"
 "In the Garden"
 "Step Back"
 "Forever Were Tied"
 "About You"
 "Acting Crazy (It's a Breakdown)"
 "Silently"

References

2007 albums
Royal Wood albums